Stearnes may refer to:

Stearnes, Virginia, U.S., unincorporated community
Turkey Stearnes (1901– 1979), American baseball player

See also
Stearne, given name and surname
Stearns (disambiguation)
Sterns (disambiguation)